Milik Bagha is a village in Bagha Upazila of Rajshahi District of Bangladesh.

References 

Villages in Rajshahi Division